Weston Underwood is a civil parish in the Amber Valley district of Derbyshire, England.  The parish contains 16 listed buildings that are recorded in the National Heritage List for England. Of these, two are listed at Grade I, the highest of the three grades, one is at Grade II*, the middle grade, and the others are at Grade II, the lowest grade.  The parish contains the villages of Weston Underwood and Mugginton and the surrounding area, including part of Kedleston Park.  The listed buildings in the park are a bridge and a cascade, a Gothic temple, and a sawmill and engine houses.  Elsewhere, they include houses, cottages and associated structures, farmhouses and farm buildings, a church and two mileposts.


Key

Buildings

References

Citations

Sources

 

Lists of listed buildings in Derbyshire